Squash South Africa is recognised as the South African national governing body of the sport of squash by SASCOC.

See also
 South Africa men's national squash team
 South Africa women's national squash team

References

External links
 Official site

Sports governing bodies in South Africa
Organisations based in Johannesburg
National members of the World Squash Federation
Squash in South Africa